The Fishback Neighborhood Historic District is a residential historic district located southeast of the central business district of Fort Smith, Arkansas.  The district, originally bounded by Rogers, South Greenwood, and South 31st Streets and Dodson Avenue, was developed out of the former estate of William Meade Fishback in the first three decades of the 20th century.  Most of the houses built are Colonial or Classical Revival, or Tudor Revival, although the Craftsman style is also well represented.  The district was listed with these bounds in 2010; in 2015 it was enlarged to the west by the addition of properties as far west as South 24th Street.

See also
National Register of Historic Places listings in Sebastian County, Arkansas

References

Victorian architecture in Arkansas
Buildings and structures in Fort Smith, Arkansas
Historic districts on the National Register of Historic Places in Arkansas
National Register of Historic Places in Sebastian County, Arkansas